Ricardo Alexandre de Almeida Viegas (born 1 May 1992)  is a Portuguese footballer who plays for Os Belenenses as a forward.

Football career
In 2008, aged 16, Viegas joined Belenenses' youth system. He was promoted to the first team for 2011–12, with the Lisbon side in the second division.

Viegas made his official debut with the main squad on 31 July 2011, playing 22 minutes in a 0–0 away draw against Penafiel for the season's Portuguese League Cup.

References

External links

1992 births
Footballers from Lisbon
Living people
Portuguese footballers
Association football forwards
C.F. Os Belenenses players
Liga Portugal 2 players
C.D. Mafra players
S.C.U. Torreense players
União Montemor players
Casa Pia A.C. players